Sloan Valve Company is a privately owned American company specializing in plumbing valves and fixtures.

History

The company was founded by William Elvis Sloan in Chicago, Illinois in 1906 with the introduction of the Royal flushometer, a valve to release a measured amount of water to flush a urinal or toilet. Initial sales were very poor: only a single Royal model flushometer was sold in 1906, and two were sold in 1907. Fortunately, in 1908, the company sold 150 units. Initially, potential customers were wary of adjusting to his invention. Even some plumbing fixture manufacturers wouldn't sell their products if they were furnished with Sloan's flushometers. However, the original 1906 design has proven so reliable that as of 2012, parts are still available to repair any flushometer ever made.

In addition to its flush valves based on diaphragm technology, Sloan also introduced piston-type flushometers, including the Crown and the GEM 2. A special piston-type flushometer, called the Naval, was built for marine applications. In 1976, Sloan introduced the Optima line of sensor-activated flushometers (the first few were installed at Chicago's O'Hare International Airport); battery-powered equivalents under the name Optima Plus followed in 1991. Sloan also now has solar-powered models with a battery back-up that operate using any artificial or natural light source.

Water-saving initiatives
Sloan has made a major commitment to producing equipment that minimizes consumption of water. This effort is led by co-presidents Jim Allen, Kirk Allen and Graham Allen.

The company is producing the dual-flush Uppercut flushometer with a green handle. Pressing the lever down produces a regular 1.6-gallon flush, while lifting the lever up produces a 1.1 gallon flush.

Sloan also introduced waterfree urinals that use a special trap with a lightweight, biodegradable oil that allows the urine to pass through but prevents odors from escaping.

The company also offers sensor-activated flushometers and other plumbing fixtures, including water-efficient electronic faucets, solid-surface lavatory systems, stainless-steel scrub sinks and wash stations, and bedpan washer flushometers. Other restroom fixtures include sensor-activated hand dryers, low-flow showerheads, networked water-control systems, and electronic soap dispensers.

Sponsorship
In January 2015 Sloan announced a new marketing and sponsor partnership with the Chicago Cubs and Wrigley Field which included naming rights to the Cubs spring training facility in Mesa, Arizona.  Formerly named Cubs Park, the stadium is now called Sloan Park.

References

Manufacturing companies established in 1906
Manufacturing companies based in Illinois
Companies based in Cook County, Illinois
Plumbing materials companies
Franklin Park, Illinois
1906 establishments in Illinois
Sanitation companies
Bathroom fixture companies